The Junkers Ju 268 was the un-manned bomber component of the Mistel V parasite bomber project designed in Germany during 1944.

Development 
The Mistel V was a composite bomber comprising a Heinkel He 162A-2 piloted component and a specially developed Arado E377 glider bomb. Due to shortages at the Arado design offices, several other composites were studied as replacements for the Arado E377, and in late 1944 Junkers proposed the Ju268 as an alternate bomber component for the Mistel V, with a Messerschmitt Me 262 studied as an alternative piloted component.

The Ju 268 was simply designed with wooden structure and a nose equipped with a so-called "Voreilzunder", which already was used on some Ju 88 aircraft a re-usable jettisonable undercarriage dolly, and BMW 003 or Jumo 004 turbojet engines with BMW 028 booster rocket engines.

A bomb payload of 10 tons could be loaded and a speed of 800 km/h was projected, for kamikaze missions a manned version of the Ju 268 was under study with a glazed cockpit section in the front of the aircraft. The Ju 268 was not built.

See also

External links 
WebCite Junkers Ju 268

Ju 268
Parasite aircraft
Aircraft with auxiliary rocket engines
Abandoned military aircraft projects of Germany